Agonopterix aspersella is a moth of the family Depressariidae. It is found in France, Spain and Romania and on Corsica and Sicily.

The wingspan is 21–24 mm.

References

Moths described in 1888
Agonopterix
Moths of Europe